Manal was an Argentine rock group. 

Manal may also refer to:

 Manal (name), list of people with the name
 Manal Kayiru, 1982 Indian comedy drama film
 Manal Kayiru 2, 2016 Indian comedy drama film 
 Manal Naharam, 2015 Indian film
 Manal Matha Shrine, church in Tamil Nadu
 Dewal Manal, union council in Pakistan